The HealthSouth Inaugural was a golf tournament on the LPGA Tour from 1980 to 1999. It was played at several courses in Florida. HealthSouth Corporation sponsored the event from 1993 to 1999.

Tournaments venues

Winners
HEALTHSOUTH Inaugural
1999 Kelly Robbins
1998 Kelly Robbins
1997 Michelle McGann
1996 Karrie Webb
1995 Pat Bradley

HEALTHSOUTH Palm Beach Classic
1994 Dawn Coe-Jones
1993 Tammie Green

Oldsmobile LPGA Classic
1992 Colleen Walker
1991 Meg Mallon
1990 Pat Bradley
1989 Dottie Mochrie

Mazda Classic
1988 Nancy Lopez
1987 Kathy Postlewait
1986 Val Skinner

Mazda Classic of Deer Creek
1985 Hollis Stacy
1984 Silvia Bertolaccini
1983 Pat Bradley

Whirlpool Championship of Deer Creek
1982 Hollis Stacy
1981 Sandra Palmer
1980 JoAnne Carner

References

External links
Tournament results at Golfobserver.com

Former LPGA Tour events
Golf in Florida
Recurring sporting events established in 1980
Recurring sporting events disestablished in 1999
1980 establishments in Florida
1999 disestablishments in Florida
Women's sports in Florida